Quinnen Williams (born December 5, 1997) is an American football defensive tackle for the New York Jets of the National Football League (NFL). He played college football at Alabama and was drafted by the Jets with the 3rd overall pick in the 2019 NFL Draft. He is the younger brother of his Jets teammate, linebacker Quincy Williams.

Early years
Williams attended Wenonah High School in Birmingham, Alabama. His mother died of breast cancer in 2010. He was rated as a four-star prospect and the 17th best defensive tackle in the country for the class of 2016 by the 247Sports Composite. Williams originally committed to Auburn University to play college football but changed to the University of Alabama on June 30, 2015.

College career
After redshirting his first year at Alabama in 2016, Williams played in all 14 games as a redshirt freshman in 2017, recording 20 tackles and two sacks. He had two tackles in the 2018 College Football Playoff National Championship victory over Georgia.

Williams was named the starting nose guard prior to Alabama's 2018 season opener against Louisville. He accounted for six total tackles and 3.5 tackles for loss in the game and was named SEC Co-Defensive Line player of the week. In a shutout win against LSU on November 3, Williams had 10 total tackles, 3.5 for loss, and 2.5 sacks, and was named Walter Camp National Defensive Player of the Week and SEC Defensive Player of the Week.

After his redshirt sophomore season, Williams was named a unanimous first-team All-American and first-team All-SEC. He was awarded the Outland Trophy as the nation's best interior lineman. His 20 tackles for loss were tied for second in the SEC, and his eight sacks were tied for fifth in the conference.

On January 11, 2019, Williams announced that he would forgo his remaining two years of eligibility and enter the 2019 NFL Draft.

College statistics

Professional career

Williams was drafted by the New York Jets with the third overall pick in the 2019 NFL Draft. On July 25, 2019, Williams agreed to a four-year deal with the Jets worth $32.5 million featuring a $21.6 million signing bonus and a fifth year option.

On August 26, 2019, Williams was fined $21,056 for a late hit on Matt Schaub in the second preseason game against the Atlanta Falcons.

2019
Williams played his first regular season game on September 8, 2019 against the Buffalo Bills, but did not record a stat, and left the game in the third quarter due to an ankle injury.
In Week 9 against the Miami Dolphins, Williams recorded his first career sack on Ryan Fitzpatrick in the 26–18 loss. In Week 10 against the New York Giants, Williams recorded his first career fumble recovery, securing a football lost by Golden Tate on the final play of the game in the Jets' 34–27 victory. In Week 16 against the Pittsburgh Steelers, Williams recorded his second sack of the season in the Jets' 16–10 win, though this would be his final tackle of the season. Overall, Williams would finish his rookie season with 28 tackles, 2.5 sacks and 1 fumble recovery in his 13 games played.

2020
In Week 2 against the San Francisco 49ers, Williams recorded his first two sacks of the season during the 31–13 loss. On October 10, Williams was fined $25,000 for two personal fouls that he committed in Week 4 against the Denver Broncos.
In Week 12 against the Miami Dolphins, Williams recorded 1.5 sacks on Ryan Fitzpatrick and forced a fumble on running back Matt Breida that was recovered by the Jets during the 20–3 loss. On December 23, 2020, Williams was placed on injured reserve, causing him to miss the final two games of the season. He received one All-Pro vote for the 2020 season.

2021
On May 4, 2021, it was revealed that Williams was diagnosed with a small fracture in his foot. He underwent surgery three days later.

On October 4 in a game against the Tennessee Titans, Quinnen and his brother Quincy, who joined the Jets earlier that season, made NFL history by each recording a sack in the win.

2022
The Jets picked up the fifth-year option on Williams' contract on April 26, 2022. In Week 6, Williams had five tackles, two sacks, a forced fumble and a blocked field goal in a 27-10 win over the Green Bay Packers, earning AFC Defensive Player of the Week.

NFL career statistics

Personal life
Amidst the COVID-19 pandemic in April 2020, Williams donated healthy meals to medical professionals on the front lines in New Jersey. Williams also helped give away over 10,000 boxes of fruits and vegetables for those in need at Historic Legion Field in Birmingham, Alabama. This event was held by Former University of Alabama football player Chris Rogers, who created the nonprofit organization Together Assisting People (TAP).

References

External links
  Sports Reference (college)
 Alabama Crimson Tide bio
 New York Jets bio

1997 births
Living people
Alabama Crimson Tide football players
All-American college football players
American football defensive tackles
New York Jets players
Players of American football from Birmingham, Alabama
American Conference Pro Bowl players